The Somali Civil Aviation Authority (SCAA) (previously: Somali Civil Aviation and Meteorology Authority (SCAMA)) is the national civil aviation authority body of Somalia. Based at the Aden Adde International Airport in the capital Mogadishu, it is under the aegis of the federal Ministry of Air and Land Transport. In 2012, the ministry along with the Somali Civil Aviation Steering Committee set a three-year window for reconstruction of the national civil aviation capacity. After a long period of management by the Civil Aviation Caretaker Authority for Somalia (CACAS), SCAMA in conjunction with the International Civil Aviation Organization also finalized a process in 2014 to transfer control of Somalia airspace to the new Air Space Management Centre in the capital.

History

CACAS
Prior to collapse of the central government with the outbreak of the civil war in 1991, the Somali Civil Aviation Authority oversaw Somalia's airspace. The UN's Civil Aviation Caretaker Authority for Somalia (CACAS) since then collected over-flight revenues on behalf of the country, reinvesting the proceeds into air traffic control and airport maintenance.

Transitional period
In 2002, the newly formed Transitional National Government (TNG) briefly reassumed control of Somalia's airspace with the re-establishment of the Somali Civil Aviation Authority by the Ministry of Air and Land Transport.

With the creation of the TNG's successor the Transitional Federal Government (TFG) in 2004, the reconstituted central government of Somalia resumed formal preparations in 2011 to transfer supervision of the country's airspace from the Nairobi-based CACAS to its aviation ministry. After reassuming control of the Somali capital Mogadishu in mid-2011, the TFG also on a contractual basis delegated airport maintenance and operation duties at the Aden Adde International Airport to the Dubai-based SKA Air and Logistics, a private firm specializing in conflict zones.

In April 2012, former Somali Airlines pilots, Abikar Nur and Ahmed Elmi Gure, met with aviation officials at the Lufthansa Flight Training Center in Phoenix, United States, to discuss the possibility of resuming the historic working relationship between Somali Airlines and Lufthansa. The meeting ended with a pledge by the school's chairman, Captain Matthias Kippenberg, to assist the Somali aviation authorities in training prospective pilots.

In July 2012, Mohammed Osman Ali (Dhagah-tur), the General Director of the Ministry of Aviation and Transport, announced that the Somali government had begun preparations to revive the national carrier, Somali Airlines. The Somali authorities along with the Somali Civil Aviation Steering Committee (SCASC) -- a joint commission composed of officials from Somalia's federal and regional governments as well as members of the CACAS, ICAO/TCB and UNDP—convened with international aviation groups in Montreal to request support for the ongoing rehabilitation efforts. The SCASC set a three-year window for reconstruction of the national civil aviation capacity. It also requested the complete transfer of Somali civil aviation operations and assets from the CACAS caretaker body to the Somali authorities.

Control of airspace
After meeting with CACAS representatives, Abdullahi Elmoge Hersi, Somalia's then Minister of Information, Posts and Telecommunications, announced in May 2013 that the Somali federal government would reassume control of the country's airspace by December 31. In preparation for the transition, staff within Somalia were receiving training, with over 100 airspace personnel scheduled to be transferred to Mogadishu for management duties.

In June 2014, Minister of Air Transportation and Civil Aviation Said Jama Qorshel announced that the decision to transfer management of Somalia's air space to the federal government had been finalized, following a meeting between himself and International Civil Aviation Organization (ICAO) representatives in Montreal. He indicated that the officials had agreed to relocate all of the necessary equipment to the new Air Space Management Centre in Mogadishu, technology that ICAO had previously operated on the Somali Civil Aviation Authority's behalf. Additionally, Qorshel stated that the planning stage of the transfer process would soon conclude, and trained Somali technicians would thereafter assume their aviation duties in the capital. He also said that modern aviation equipment had already been imported from Italy, and that additional up-to-date technology earmarked for the Aden Adde International Airport in Mogadishu would be delivered.

On 17 December 2014, Transport Minister Qorshel announced that the Somali government had regained control of its airspace after reaching an agreement with the International Civil Aviation Organization. The minister also indicated that Somalia's airspace would be managed from the capital Mogadishu, and additional professionals would be trained for the purpose.

See also
List of civil aviation authorities

References

External links
SCAMA

Civil aviation in Somalia
Somalia
Transport organisations based in Somalia